The Battle of Radda was a military confrontation in March 2013, initially launched by Al-Qaeda in an apparent reprisal for the Yemen army's offensive against their stronghold of al-Manasseh following the collapse of talks to free the three Western hostages believed to be held in the area, of whom a Finnish couple and an Austrian man who were studying Arabic in Yemen, when they were snatched by local tribesmen in the capital city of Sanaa, where they were then sold to al-Qaeda militants and transferred to the southern province of al-Bayda, where the city of al-Manasseh is located.

Battle
On 28 January, a suicide bomber drove a car laden with explosives into an army checkpoint in Rada, near the town of al-Manasseh, killing eleven Yemeni soldiers and wounding another 17 more. The checkpoints were set up just days prior to the attack, but after the announcement of the offensive the suicide bomber detonated his explosive car at one. The same day, militants ambushed and killed three Yemeni soldiers in a separate attack, on the outskirts of Radda.

On 29 March, clashes erupted in Radda after a group of insurgents said to be from al-Qaeda in the Arabian Peninsula (AQAP) raided a military checkpoint of the Republican guards at the main entrance to Rada. At least two militants were killed and one Yemeni soldiers were killed.

On 27 April, fighting resumed in Radda, leaving five Yemeni soldiers and two militants dead. According to a Yemeni security source, the soldiers were killed when al-Qaeda linked militants targeted an army checkpoint in the Rada' District, where the interior ministry announced on Friday its intentions to mount security measures following intelligence about possible attacks by al-Qaeda. A gunfight followed between Yemeni troops and the insurgents, reportedly killing two of the attackers.

References

Conflicts in 2013
March 2013 events in Yemen
April 2013 events in Yemen
2013 in Yemen
Battles in 2013